is a passenger railway station in located in the town of  Susami,  Nishimuro District, Wakayama Prefecture, Japan, operated by West Japan Railway Company (JR West).

Lines

Station layout
The station consists of one island platform and one side platform connected to the station building by a level crossing. One side of the island platform (Platform 2) is not in use. The station is unattended.

Platforms

Adjacent stations

|-
!colspan=5|West Japan Railway Company (JR West)

History
Susami Station opened on October 30, 1936. With the privatization of the Japan National Railways (JNR) on April 1, 1987, the station came under the aegis of the West Japan Railway Company.

Passenger statistics
In fiscal 2019, the station was used by an average of 115 passengers daily (boarding passengers only).

Surrounding Area
Susami Town Hall
Susami Municipal Susami Elementary School
Susami Municipal Susami Junior High School
Susami Municipal National Health Insurance Susami Hospital

See also
List of railway stations in Japan

References

External links

 Susami Station (West Japan Railway) 

Railway stations in Wakayama Prefecture
Railway stations in Japan opened in 1936
Susami, Wakayama